Flint Capital is an international venture capital firm focused on startups in health technology, cybersecurity, consumer technology, and SaaS. The firm is headquartered in Boston, United States. Flint Capital's managing partners are Dmitry Smirnov, Sergey Gribov, and Andrew Gershfeld.

History 

Flint Capital, a venture capital firm whose name pays homage to Robert Louis Stevenson's Treasure Island novel, was established in 2013. By 2022, Flint Capital had two $100-million funds under management, over 45 portfolio companies, including 3 unicorns, and 13 successful exits.

Flint Capital focuses on a wide array of technology sectors, including digital health, financial technology, cybersecurity, DevOps, SaaS, and more. It pays special attention to startups launched by immigrant entrepreneurs from Eastern Europe and Israel, and around a half of its funding goes towards Israeli companies. Its most successful investments included Socure (valued at $4.5 billion), Flo (valued at $800 million), and WalkMe (valued at $2.5 billion), each returning over $100 million on initial investments—more than the respective funds had raised.

Management 
Flint Capital's investment team includes Dmitry Smirnov, Sergey Gribov, and Andrew Gershfeld. The firm operates a head office in Boston, United States and an office in Tel Aviv, Israel.

Funds 

 Flint Capital I is a $107-million fund launched in 2013 to invest from $0.5 to $2 million on average in the early stage. The fund claims to have TVPI (total value to paid-in, the total value of the fund's holdings related to capital raised) among the top 10% venture funds globally.
 Flint Capital II is a $103-million fund raised by 2020. It's focused on seed and Series A and B rounds, with an average check size between $1 and $3 million. By the end of 2021, the second fund had made 18 investments, leading no less than 8, and had two successful exits.

Investments 

Flint Capital's investments and exits include, but ain't limited to:

 Socure (AI-based identity verification platform)
 Flo (AI-based health app for women)
 Antidote Health (telehealth services provider)
 Cyolo (cloud-based secure connectivity provider)
 Circles (online emotional support platform)
 ODAIA (AI-powered commercial insights platform for pharmaceutical companies)
 CyberX (industrial cybersecurity platform, acquired by Microsoft in 2020)
 Voca.AI (AI-based voice assistants for customer service, acquired by Snap in 2020)
 Loom Systems (AI-powered customer experience analytics, acquired by ServiceNow in 2020)
 WalkMe (digital adoption platform, IPO at NASDAQ in 2021)

References 

Venture capital firms of the United States